The UCLA Bruins women's basketball program was established in 1974. The current coach is Cori Close. The team was a member of the Association for Intercollegiate Athletics for Women (AIAW) until joining the NCAA in 1984. The UCLA Bruins women's basketball team won the AIAW National Championship in 1978, and a banner commemorating  the championship hangs in Pauley Pavilion, the current home of the Bruins basketball teams. The 2014–15 team won the 2015 WNIT championship.

2012–13 season
 November 9, 2012 – The team returned to the newly renovated Pauley Pavilion and defeated San Diego State 66–52
 November 23, 2012 – No. 19 UCLA were defeated by No. 5 Notre Dame 76–64
 January 13, 2013 – UCLA opened the conference with 4 straight victories.

2011–12 season
While Pauley Pavilion was being renovated, the women's basketball team played its 2011–12 season home games at the John Wooden Center.
 April 21, 2011 – Cori Close was named head coach.

2010–11 season
November 12, 2010 – The No. 16 Bruins opened the season with a win over San Diego State 55–48.
November 18, 2010 – UCLA upset No. 12 Notre Dame in double overtime, 86–83 at Notre Dame to begin the season with a 3–0 record.
 February 6, 2011 – UCLA defeated USC for the second time this season at Galen Center.
 March 12, 2011 – The Bruins were defeated by Stanford in the 2011 Pac-10 Women's Basketball Tournament Final in the Staples Center.
 March 25, 2011 – Mariah Williams, Rebekah Gardner and Markel Walker were named to the 2011 Pac-10 Conference Women's Basketball All-Academic Team.

1978 National championship 
The 1978 team, led by Ann Meyers, Denise Curry and Anita Ortega, won the 1978 AIAW tournament under head coach Billie Moore. The Bruins defeated Maryland 90–74 on March 25, 1978 in front of a record crowd of 9,351 at Pauley Pavilion for the championship. Meyers had 20 points, 10 rebounds, nine assists and eight steals. Ortega recorded a team high 23 points. This team finished the season with a 27–3 record, including a then WCAA conference title.

Head coaches

 Cori Close
Nikki Fargas
Kathy Olivier
Billie Moore
Ellen Mosher
Kenny Washington

Notable players
Jordin Canada, Seattle Storm
Monique Billings, Atlanta Dream
Nikki Blue, New York Liberty
Denise Curry
Michelle Greco
Jackie Joyner-Kersee
Maylana Martin
Ann Meyers, Phoenix Mercury
Natalie Nakase
Teiko Nishi
Anita Ortega
Rehema Stephens
Noelle Quinn, Phoenix Mercury
Sandra Van Embricqs
Natalie Williams, Indiana Fever
Lisa Willis, Los Angeles Sparks

Retired numbers

Year by year results
Conference tournament winners noted with # Source

|-style="background: #ffffdd;"
| colspan="8" align="center" | Pac-12 Conference

Postseason results

NCAA Division I

AIAW Division I
The Bruins made three appearances in the AIAW National Division I basketball tournament, with a combined record of 8–3.

References

External links